Sardar Ghulam Mustafa Khan Tareen was a Pakistani politician who was a Member of the Provincial Assembly of Balochistan, from May 2013 to May 2018. He died on 22 April 2020 after testing positive for COVID-19.

Early life and education
He was born on 1 January 1950 in Pishin District.

He has done Matriculation.

Political career

He was elected to the Provincial Assembly of Balochistan as a candidate of Pashtunkhwa Milli Awami Party from Constituency PB-10-Pishin-III in 2013 Pakistani general election.

References

Living people
Balochistan MPAs 2013–2018
1950 births